Neoeromene parvalis is a moth in the family Crambidae. It was described by Francis Walker in 1866. It is found in the upper Amazon region, where it has been recorded from Brazil and Peru.

Adults have been recorded on wing in August.

References

Diptychophorini
Moths described in 1866